Edutainment is the fourth album from Boogie Down Productions. Released on July 17, 1990, it is an album whose lyrics deal with afrocentricity and socio-political knowledge. It has 6 skits/interludes known as 'exhibits' that all talk about or relate to Black people. Many skits feature Kwame Ture (né Stokely Carmichael) a leader of the U.S. Civil Rights Movement and Black Power Movement. The album was certified Gold by the RIAA on October 10, 1990. KRS One has stated in interviews that the album has sold over 700,000 copies

Track listing

Instrumental credits
"100 Guns"
Keyboards: Sidney Mills

Charts

Certifications

Later samples
"100 Guns"
"Kingdom Come" by Jay-Z from the album Kingdom Come
"New York" by Ja Rule featuring Fat Joe and Jadakiss from the album R.U.L.E.
"Love's Gonna Get'cha (Material Love)" Contains a sample from Pat Metheny Group called Spring Ain't Here and a sample of Jocelyn Brown's song Love's Gonna Get You
"The Day the Niggas Took Over" by Dr. Dre featuring Dat Nigga Daz (for first time ever), RBX, Snoop Dogg from the album The Chronic
"Growin' Up in the Hood" by Compton's Most Wanted from the album Straight Checkn 'Em
"I Shot the Sheriff" by Warren G
"Beef"
"SlaughtaHouse" by Masta Ace Incorporated from the album Slaughtahouse
"Blackman in Effect"
"Judge Not" by LPG featuring Pigeon John from the album The Earthworm
"Open Your Eyes" by Immortal Technique from the album The 3rd World
"Talking in My Sleep" by Elzhi from the album The Preface
"Breath Control II"
"They Want EFX" by Das EFX from the album Dead Serious
"House Niggas"
"Uncle Tom Artist" by Smokin' Suckaz wit Logic from the album Playin' Foolz
"Original Lyrics"
"East Coast" by Das EFX from the album Dead Serious
"East Coast Funk" by Daddy-O from the album You Can be A Daddy, But Never Daddy-O
"30 Cops Or More" 
"Contains samples from Melvin Van Peebles' 1971 Movie Sweet Sweetback's Baadasssss Song

References

Jive Records albums
1990 albums
Boogie Down Productions albums
Albums produced by KRS-One